The Prussian Secret Police was the secret police agency of the German state of Prussia in the 19th and early 20th centuries.

In 1851 the Police Union of German States was set up by the police forces of Austria, Prussia, Bavaria, Saxony, Hanover, Baden, and Württemberg. It was specifically organised to suppress political dissent in the wake of the 1848 revolutions which spread across Germany. For the next fifteen years the Union held annual meetings to exchange information. Karl Ludwig Friedrich von Hinckeldey, the Police Commissioner of Berlin, was appointed by King Friedrich Wilhelm IV on 16 November 1848. He was to prove to be a key figure in the development of the secret police in Prussia as well as the whole union. By 1854, thanks to his close relationship with the king he was appointed Generalpolizeidirektor (General Director of Police). Effectively he was a minister of police independent from the minister of the interior. Von Hinckeldey founded the Berlin political police in Berlin and developed a Prussian information catalogue on political opponents, focusing on revolutionaries involved in the 1848 uprisings. But as he saw Paris and London as the centers of political intrigue he was keen to organize the policing of political opponents outside borders of national jurisdictions.

The Prussian Secret Police has historically held a bad reputation, as it was the model upon which the Gestapo was later founded. The Prussian Secret Police, however, did not routinely engage in persecution or the abuse of police powers, and did not behave in the way that other secret police forces might.

The Prussian Secret Police was renamed in 1933 as the Gestapo. Prussia itself was dissolved as an administrative entity following World War II.

See also 
 Wilhelm Stieber

References
 Deflem, Mathieu (1996). "International Policing in Nineteenth-Century Europe: The Police Union of German States, 1851–1866". International Criminal Justice Review 6:36–57.
 Deflem, Mathieu (2002). Policing World Society: Historical Foundations of International Police Cooperation. Oxford, UK: Oxford University Press. 

1933 disestablishments in Germany
Defunct German intelligence agencies
Defunct law enforcement agencies of the Weimar Republic
Weimar Republic intelligence agencies
Secret Police
Secret police